Fiona Samuel  (born 1961) is a New Zealand writer, actor and director who was born in Scotland. Samuel's award-winning career spans theatre, film, radio and television. She graduated from Toi Whakaari: New Zealand Drama School in 1980 with a Diploma in Acting.

Plays 
2010  – Ghost Train
2004 – The Liar’s Bible
1996 – One Flesh
1993 – Lashings of Whipped Cream: A Session with a Teenage Dominatrix
1988 – The Wedding Party

Publications
2013 20 New Zealand Playwrights (interview), Playmarket 
2011 Number 8 Wire; 8 Plays, 8 Decades, Playmarket 
2011 One Flesh in No. 8 Wire: 8 Plays/8 Decades. 
1995 Lashings of Whipped Cream: A Session with a Teenage Dominatrix 
 1989 Blonde Bombshell in Three Radio Plays.

Short film
2006 Writer and Director - The Garden of Love
2001 Written with Murray Keane - Falling Sparrows
1996 Writer and Director - Song of the Siren
1994 Writer - Bitch
1994 Written with Murray Keane - Prickle

Television
2014 Writer – Consent – The Louise Nicholas Story
2013 Head writer and episode writer – Agent Anna Series 2
2011–2013 Story liner and episode writer over three series – Nothing Trivial
2011 Episode writer – The Almighty Johnsons
2010 Writer and Director – Bliss – The Beginning of Katherine Mansfield
2008 Writer and Director – Piece of My Heart
2006–2009 Episode writer over three series – Outrageous Fortune
2006 Writer and Director – Interrogation: Girl in Woods
2001–2004 Episode writer over three series – Mercy Peak
2001 Writer and Director – Virginity – A Documentary
1998 Writer and Director – Home Movie
1994 Writer and Director – A Real Dog
1994 Writer – Her New Life
1994 Writer – House Rules
1987 Creator and Writer – The Marching Girls

Radio
1994 Don't Touch That Dial
1993 A Short History of Contraception
1991 Words of Love
1983 Blonde Bombshell

Awards and honours
2019 – Member of the New Zealand Order of Merit, for services to television and theatre.
2015 – NEXT Woman of the Year, Arts & Culture category.
2014 – NZ Film and Television Awards, Best Television Drama – The Louise Nicholas Story
2014 – Script Writers Awards NZ (SWANZ),Best Telefeature Script – The Louise Nicolas Story 
2012 – New Zealand Arts Foundation Arts Laureate 
2012 – New Zealand Television Awards. Best Director – Bliss 
2011 – New Zealand Writers Guild Award, Best Telefeature Script – Bliss 
2010 – New Zealand Writers Guild Awards, Best Play -Ghost Train 
2009 – New Zealand Screen Award, Best Actress and Best Supporting Actress - Piece of My Heart
2006 – New Zealand Film and Television Awards Best Script: Drama – Interrogation: Girl in Woods 
2005 – Buddle Findlay Sargeson Fellowship 
1999 – University of Auckland Literary Fellowship 
1998 – New Zealand Film and Television Awards Best Drama – Home Movie
1996 – Bilboa Film Festival, Mikeldi de Ficcion D'oro, Best Short Film – Song of the Siren
1996 – Turin Film Festival, Audience Award – Song of the Siren
1994 – Mobil Awards, Best Radio Drama – A Short History of Contraception 
1994 – Mobil Awards, Best Radio Drama – Don't Touch That Dial 
1993 – National Radio's Women's Suffrage Centenary Playwriting Award – A Short History of Contraception 
1984 – Mobil Awards, Best Radio Drama – Blond Bombshell

References

1961 births
Living people
20th-century New Zealand dramatists and playwrights
20th-century New Zealand women writers
New Zealand television directors
20th-century New Zealand actresses
Members of the New Zealand Order of Merit
Scottish emigrants to New Zealand
21st-century New Zealand actresses
21st-century New Zealand dramatists and playwrights
21st-century New Zealand women writers
New Zealand women dramatists and playwrights
Women television directors
Toi Whakaari alumni